Melody Day (Hangul: 멜로디데이) was a South Korean girl group formed in 2012. The group officially debuted with their single album Another Parting in February 2014 and with three members: Yeoeun, Chahee, and Yein. The fourth member, Yoomin was added to the group in October 2014. On December 26, 2018, it was confirmed that all four members decided to not renew their contracts with Cre.ker Entertainment, ultimately ending the group.

History

2012–2013: Pre-debut 
Melody Day started their career as a trio in 2012, featuring on soundtracks for dramas such as Bridal Mask, Cheongdam-dong Alice, Missing You, My Daughter Seo-young, The King of Dramas, I Can Hear Your Voice, Master's Sun and Pretty Man. On June 26, 2013, they released the ballad track "Loving Alone" as part of the single album New Wave Studio Rookie, Vol. 1.

2014–2016: Debut, new member Yoomin and further releases 

The group made their official debut on February 25, 2014 with release their debut single album Another Parting. Its music video featured the actors Seo In-guk and Wang Ji-won. The group made their debut stage on music program Music Bank on February 28.

Melody Day released duet project featured 2AM's Changmin titled "The Very Last First" were released on May 21 and featured CNBLUE's Lee Jong-hyun titled  "To Tell You The Truth" were released on August 14. They released the original soundtrack for the drama You Are My Destiny with the single "You're My Everything", a remake of Jeff Bernat's "Be The One".

In October, Melody Day officially introduced their fourth member: Yoomin. The group released their first song as four member, "Listen to My Heart" for the drama Naeil's Cantabile. On December 12, Melody Day released their first digital single "Anxious" featuring popular rapper Mad Clown.

Melody Day's second single album #LoveMe was released on June 9, 2015.
They continue with released their third single album Speed Up on 
October 7. Their comeback showcase was held at the Ilji Art Hall on the same day as the album's release. On December 28, Melody Day released their second digital single "When It Rains" featuring VIXX's rapper Ravi.

Melody Day released their first mini album Color on July 1, 2016, with a total of six tracks including the lead single "Color" and previous digital "When It Rains". In December 2016, Melody Day recorded the original soundtrack song "Beautiful Day" for the web drama First Seven Kisses.

2017–2018: Kiss on the Lips, Restless and disbandment
Melody Day released their third digital single "You Seem Busy" featuring BtoB's Ilhoon, on January 25, 2017. The song was produced by Polar Bear and its lyrics were penned by JQ and Ilhoon. Melody Day's second mini album, Kiss On The Lips, was released on February 15, where composed of six track including the lead single "Kiss On The Lips" and previous single "You Seem Busy".

On September 25, Cre.Ker Entertainment confirmed that Yeoeun, Yoomin, and Chahee had participated in competition show The Unit. On the finale round, Chahee ranked 16th, Yeoeun ranked 18th and they failed to entered the winning group line-up, as well as Yoomin was eliminated in 31st before final round.

Melody Day released their fourth digital single "Restless" on June 29, 2018.

On December 26, 2018, it was confirmed that all four members decided to not renew their contracts with the label, ultimately ending the group.

Members
 Yeoeun (Hangul: 여은) – leader, main vocal
 Yoomin (유민) – sub vocal, main rapper
 Yein (예인) – lead vocal
 Chahee (차희) – sub vocal

Discography

Extended plays

Single albums

Singles

Soundtrack appearances

Collaborations

Videography

Music videos

Awards and nominations

References

External links

 

South Korean girl groups
Musical groups established in 2012
2012 establishments in South Korea
Kakao M artists